The 1988 Mid-Eastern Athletic Conference men's basketball tournament took place March 3–5, 1988, at Greensboro Coliseum in Greensboro, North Carolina. North Carolina A&T defeated , 101–86 in the championship game, to win its seventh consecutive MEAC Tournament title.

The Aggies earned an automatic bid to the 1988 NCAA tournament as a No. 14 seed in the East region.

Format
Seven of nine conference members participated, with play beginning in the quarterfinal round. Teams were seeded based on their regular season conference record.

Bracket

* denotes overtime period

References

MEAC men's basketball tournament
1987–88 Mid-Eastern Athletic Conference men's basketball season
MEAC men's basketball tournament
MEAC men's basketball tournament